The 2016 season for the  cycling team began in January at the La Tropicale Amissa Bongo. Team Europcar is a French-registered UCI Professional Continental cycling team that participated in road bicycle racing events on the UCI Continental Circuits and when selected as a wildcard to UCI ProTour events.

The sponsor on jerseys is Poweo in the cycling races taking place in Belgium.

Team roster

Riders who joined the team for the 2016 season

Riders who left the team during or after the 2015 season

Season victories

National, Continental and World champions 2016

Notes

References

External links
 Stats

2016 road cycling season by team
2016
2016 in French sport